Platyceras is a genus of extinct Paleozoic sea snails, marine gastropod mollusks in the family Platyceratidae. This genus is known from the Silurian to the Middle Triassic periods and especially abundant in the Devonian and Carboniferous. It is the type genus of the family Platyceratidae.

Description 
Platyceras has a distinctive, curved conical shape that is easily recognized. The cap-like shell is high and broad anteriorly. The posterior portion of the shell, at the apex, is usually slightly coiled in an asymmetrical fashion. Frequently, the front portions of the shells are broken, though the posterior sections are relatively well preserved. Platyceras is particularly abundant in Devonian deposits (359 million to 416 million years old). Platyceras and other platyceratid gastropods are known for the complex symbiotic relationships they had with crinoids.

Distribution 
Fossils of Platyceras have been found all over the world, among others in the Silurian Bertie Formation of Ontario and New York and the Devonian Floresta Formation of Boyacá, Colombia.

References 

 T. A. Conrad. 1840. Third annual report on the palaeontological department of the survey. New York Geological Survey, Annual Report 4(1):199-207

Bibliography 
 

Platyceratidae
Silurian first appearances
Triassic extinctions
Prehistoric molluscs of North America
Devonian animals of South America
Devonian Colombia
Fossils of Colombia
Floresta Formation
Paleozoic life of Ontario
Bertie Formation
Paleozoic life of Manitoba
Paleozoic life of New Brunswick
Paleozoic life of the Northwest Territories
Paleozoic life of Nova Scotia
Paleozoic life of Nunavut
Paleozoic life of Quebec
Fossil taxa described in 1840